Mont-Royal–Outremont is a provincial electoral district in Quebec. It was created from parts of Mont-Royal and Outremont districts.  It was first contested in the 2018 Quebec general election.

Members of the National Assembly

Election results

References

Quebec provincial electoral districts
Provincial electoral districts of Montreal